There are at least 147 named lakes and reservoirs in Phillips County, Montana.

Lakes
 Austin Lake, el. 
 Beam Lake, el. 
 Bennett Lake, el. 
 Buckley Lake, el. 
 Carter Lake, el. 
 Drumbo Unit, el. 
 Dry Lake, el. 
 Dry Lake, el. 
 Dry Lake Unit, el. 
 Erphit Lake, el. 
 Ester Lake, el. 
 Horse Shoe Lake, el. 
 Horseshoe Lake, el. 
 Indian Lake, el. 
 Lake Bowdoin, el. 
 Lakeside Unit, el. 
 Lone Tree Lake (historical), el. 
 McNeil Slough, el. 
 Mud Lake, el. 
 Mud Lake (historical), el. 
 Parrot Lake, el. 
 Pea Lake, el. 
 Shed Lake, el. 
 Solberg Slough, el. 
 The Plunge, el. 
 Whitcomb Lake, el.

Reservoirs
 3 Way Number 2 Reservoir, el. 
 Ada Reservoir, el. 
 Adair Reservoir, el. 
 Archie Reservoir, el. 
 Artie Reservoir, el. 
 Ashfield Reservoir, el. 
 Badger Reservoir, el. 
 Bass Reservoir, el. 
 Bauer Reservoir, el. 
 Bell Reservoir, el. 
 Big McNeil Slough, el. 
 Big Reservoir, el. 
 Big Rock Reservoir, el. 
 Big Sage Reservoir, el. 
 Big Snowy Reservoir, el. 
 Bison Bone Reservoir, el. 
 Black Coulee Pond, el. 
 Black Cow Reservoir, el. 
 Blizzard Reservoir, el. 
 Blue Stem Reservoir, el. 
 Bog Reservoir, el. 
 Buckskin Reservoir, el. 
 Carberry Reservoir, el. 
 Carter Reservoir, el. 
 Charley Reservoir, el. 
 Cole Ponds, el. 
 Converse Reservoir, el. 
 Dan Reservoir, el. 
 Dead Cedar Reservoir, el. 
 Deep Reservoir, el. 
 Detail Reservoir, el. 
 Dione Reservoir, el. 
 Drabbels Reservoir, el. 
 Dry Lake Reservoir, el. 
 Dusky Reservoir, el. 
 Ethel Reservoir, el. 
 Eva May Reservoir, el. 
 Express Reservoir, el. 
 Farm Pond, el. 
 First Creek Reservoir, el. 
 First Creek Reservoir, el. 
 Fish Fossil Reservoir, el. 
 Fjeldheim Reservoir, el. 
 Fort Peck Lake, el. 
 Fowler Reservoir, el. 
 Frenchman Reservoir, el. 
 Goose Island Pond, el. 
 Government Field Reservoir, el. 
 Grag Reservoir, el. 
 Gullwing Reservoir, el. 
 Happy Gang Reservoir, el. 
 Hewitt Lake, el. 
 Hilo Reservoir, el. 
 Holzhey Reservoir, el. 
 Holzhey Reservoir, el. 
 Hoverson Reservoir, el. 
 J D Reservoir, el. 
 Jones Reservoir, el. 
 King Reservoir, el. 
 Kohola Reservoir, el. 
 Lake PR-19, el. 
 Lake Reservoir, el. 
 LeNoir Reservoir, el. 
 Lester Reservoir, el. 
 Little Warm Reservoir, el. 
 Louie Reservoir, el. 
 Manning Corral Reservoir, el. 
 Martin Lake, el. 
 Martin Retaining Pit, el. 
 Mary Reservoir, el. 
 McChesney Reservoir, el. 
 McChesney Reservoir, el. 
 McNeil Reservoir, el. 
 Monster Reservoir, el. 
 Morgan Reservoir, el. 
 Nelson Reservoir, el. 
 Nelson Reservoir, el. 
 Nerve Reservoir, el. 
 Number Twenty Reservoir, el. 
 Palea Reservoir, el. 
 Paleface Reservoir, el. 
 Partnership Reservoir, el. 
 Patrol Road Pond, el. 
 Pearl Reservoir, el. 
 Pep Reservoir, el. 
 Phillips Reservoir, el. 
 Plum Reservoir, el. 
 Point of Rocks Reservoir, el. 
 PR 40 Reservoir, el. 
 Private Reservoir, el. 
 Puckett Reservoir, el. 
 Rock Creek Reservoir, el. 
 Sagebrush Reservoir, el. 
 Salene Reservoir, el. 
 Salsbery Reservoir, el. 
 Sarm Reservoir, el. 
 Schmittou Reservoir, el. 
 Seven-Up Reservoir, el. 
 Seymour Reservoir, el. 
 Shale Reservoir, el. 
 Siwash Reservoir, el. 
 Skull Reservoir, el. 
 Sorrell Reservoir, el. 
 Starter Pond, el. 
 Stratton Reservoir, el. 
 Taint Reservoir, el. 
 Timber Pit Reservoir, el. 
 Titan Reservoir, el. 
 Tondra Reservoir, el. 
 Twin Snag Reservoir, el. 
 Veseth Reservoir, el. 
 Waterfowl Reservoir, el. 
 Waydown Reservoir, el. 
 Weigand Reservoir, el. 
 West Alkali Reservoir, el. 
 Whiteface Reservoir, el. 
 Wild Horse Reservoir, el. 
 Wildlife Reservoir, el. 
 Williams Coulee Reservoir, el. 
 Wilson Reservoir, el. 
 Wrangler Reservoir, el.

See also

 List of lakes in Montana

Notes

Bodies of water of Phillips County, Montana
Phillips